The Psychic World of Walter Reed is the tenth studio album by American rapper Killah Priest. It was released on February 25, 2013. The album features guest appearances from Ghostface Killah, Inspectah Deck, George Clinton, Lord Fury, Raekwon and Alita Dupray. With production coming from Godz Wrath, Ayatollah, RZA, True Master, GZA and 4th Disciple.

Track listing

References
3.↑ The Psychic Love spells caster . Psychic Love spells ordered 2010-05-27.

Killah Priest albums
Albums produced by RZA
Albums produced by Ayatollah
Albums produced by True Master
Albums produced by Beat Butcha
2013 albums